Kaerepere is a village in Kehtna Parish, Rapla County in northern-central Estonia.

References

 

Villages in Rapla County